Adam Banasiak (born 7 December 1989 in Tomaszów Mazowiecki) is a Polish professional footballer who plays as a midfielder for Ceramika Opoczno.

Career

Club
In August 2010, he was loaned to GKP Gorzów Wlkp. from Legia Warszawa.

In July 2011, he was loaned to Olimpia Elbląg on a one-year deal.

References

External links
 
 

1989 births
Living people
Polish footballers
Ceramika Opoczno players
Legia Warsaw players
Stilon Gorzów Wielkopolski players
Olimpia Elbląg players
Widzew Łódź players
Olimpia Grudziądz players
Zagłębie Sosnowiec players
Radomiak Radom players
Chrobry Głogów players
Ekstraklasa players
I liga players
II liga players
People from Tomaszów Mazowiecki
Sportspeople from Łódź Voivodeship
Association football midfielders